Advanced Emergency Nursing Journal is a peer-reviewed nursing journal for advanced practice registered nurses in the field of emergency nursing. The journal was established in 1979 as Topics in Emergency Medicine and obtained its current title in 2006. It is published by Lippincott Williams & Wilkins and the editors-in-chief are K. Sue Hoyt (St. Mary Medical Center (Long Beach)) and Jean A. Proehl (Dartmouth–Hitchcock Medical Center).

Abstracting and indexing 
The journal is abstracted and indexed in Index Medicus/MEDLINE/PubMed and Scopus.

References

External links 
 

English-language journals
Lippincott Williams & Wilkins academic journals
Publications established in 1979
Quarterly journals
Emergency nursing journals